L'Absence  is a 2009 film.

Synopsis 
After doing brilliantly in his studies and a 15-year absence, Adama, a young polytechnician, rushes back to Senegal, his home country, when he receives a telegram saying his grandmother is very ill. His brief stay will revive a family drama seemingly forgotten.  The film reflects director Mama Keita's experience with African students who study abroad and are content to be spectators of the poverty and violence in Africa.

Awards 
 Fespaco 2009

References 

 

2009 films
French drama films
Senegalese drama films
2000s French films